The Northern Region is one of the four regions of Eastern Cape in South Africa.

Geography of the Eastern Cape